Heliotropium europaeum is a species of heliotrope known by the common names European heliotrope and European turn-sole. It is native to Europe, Asia, and North Africa, but it is widely naturalized elsewhere, such as in Australia and North America. It grows as a roadside weed in some places. This is an annual herb growing from a taproot and reaching maximum heights near 40 centimeters. The stem and oval-shaped leaves are covered in soft hairs. The inflorescences are coiled spikes of white flowers with fuzzy or bristly sepals. Each flower is just a few millimeters wide. The fruit is a bumpy nutlet.

Toxicity
Heliotropium europaeum contains pyrrolizidine alkaloids and is poisonous.

References

External links
Jepson Manual Treatment
Photo gallery

europaeum
Plants described in 1753
Taxa named by Carl Linnaeus
Flora of Malta